Mesrob or Mesrop is an Armenian given name.

Mesrob / Mesrop may refer to:
Mesrop Mashtots, also Saint Mesrop, Armenian monk, theologian and linguist. Inventor of the Armenian alphabet
Mesrop Mashtots Institute of Ancient Manuscripts, known as Matenadaran, a repository of ancient manuscripts, research institute and museum located in Yerevan, Armenia
Order of St. Mesrop Mashtots, awarded for significant achievements in Armenia
Mesrob Nishanian of Jerusalem, Armenian Patriarch of Jerusalem from 1939 to 1944
Mesrob I Naroyan of Constantinople, Armenian Patriarch of Constantinople from 1927 to 1944
Mesrob II Mutafyan of Constantinople, Armenian Patriarch of Constantinople from 1998 to 2019

See also
Mesropavan, village in Goghtn Region of Armenia, currently included into Ordubad region of Nakhichevan autonomy of Azerbaijan

Armenian masculine given names